Hilja is an Estonian and Finnish feminine given name.

Notable people
Notable people with the name include:
 Hilja Riipinen (1883–1966), Finnish politician
 Hilja Haapala (1877–1958), Finnish writer
 Hilja Keading (born 1960), American video artist
 Hilja Varem (born 1934), Estonian actress

References

Finnish feminine given names
Estonian feminine given names